Elmira Mangum (born April 10, 1953) is an American educator and retired university administrator, who served as President of Florida A&M University from 2014 to 2016. She was the 11th President of FAMU and the first woman to permanently hold the position in the 128-year history of the  university. She served as President until September 2016.

Biography
Elmira Mangum was born in Durham, North Carolina in 1953 to Ernest and Alice Blanche (née VanHook) Mangum. She obtained her bachelor's magna cum laude from North Carolina Central University and went on to receive two master's degrees in public policy and public administration, as well as a master's degree in urban and regional planning, from the University of Wisconsin, Madison. Subsequently, she earned a Ph.D. in educational leadership and policy at the University at Buffalo. She served as an associate provost at the University of North Carolina at Chapel Hill for nine years and in 2010 became the vice president for budget and planning at Cornell University.

References

1953 births
Living people
People from Durham, North Carolina
North Carolina Central University alumni
 Robert M. La Follette School of Public Affairs alumni
Presidents of Florida A&M University
University of North Carolina at Chapel Hill faculty
Cornell University faculty
Florida A&M University faculty
University at Buffalo alumni